John Duffy Huot (born May 23, 1965) is an American politician serving in the Minnesota House of Representatives since 2019. A member of the Minnesota Democratic–Farmer–Labor Party (DFL), Huot represents District 56B in the southern Twin Cities metropolitan area, which includes the cities of Apple Valley and Rosemount and parts of Dakota County, Minnesota.

Early life, education, and career
Huot graduated from Hudson High School in Wisconsin and attended trade school in Winona, Minnesota. He received an emergency medical technician certification from Century College, and a real estate certification from Kaplan Vocational-Technical School.

Minnesota House of Representatives
Huot was first elected to the Minnesota House of Representatives in 2018 and has been reelected every two years since. Huot first ran in 2016, losing to two-term Republican incumbent Anna Wills. He challenged Wills again in 2018 and won. In 2020, Huot had his election results challenged, however the case was dismissed by a judge for failing to state a claim and a lack of subject-matter jurisdiction.

Huot serves as vice chair of the State and Local Government Finance and Policy Committee and sits on the Property Tax Division of the Taxes Committees and the Public Safety Finance and Policy and Rules and Legislative Administration Committees. From 2021-22, Huot was the vice chair of the Health Finance and Policy Committee

Huot, a football and basketball referee, authored legislation that would fine unruly youth sports attendees, protecting coaches players and referees. He sponsored legislation to give the Minnesota Zoo emergency funding during the COVID-19 pandemic.

Huot, an EMT, has advocated for better conditions for volunteer EMT's in the face of declining volunteers. In a House committee, Huot supported legislation eliminating the statute of limitations on reporting sexual assault, speaking out about his experience being abused by a priest as a child.

Electoral history

Personal life
Huot and his wife, Angela, have three children. He resides in Rosemount, Minnesota. He is a Roman Catholic.

References

External links

 Official House of Representatives website
 Official campaign website

1965 births
Living people
People from Rosemount, Minnesota
Democratic Party members of the Minnesota House of Representatives
21st-century American politicians
Catholics from Minnesota